(February 18, 1903 – January 16, 1934) was a silent film star in Japan during the 1920s and early 1930s. A native of Tokyo, he first started at the Taikatsu studio and later he was a leading player for Japanese directors such as Yasujirō Ozu and Kenji Mizoguchi. Film critic Tadao Sato recounts that Okada was among the handsomes and favorite Japanese actors of the era. Throughout his career, Okada played the role of the quintessential nimaime (translated as "second line") which were romantic, sensitive men as opposed to the rugged and hard-boiled leading men known as tateyaku. He was the father of film actress Mariko Okada. Tokihiko Okada died of tuberculosis at age 30.

Filmography

References

Japanese male film actors
Japanese male silent film actors
1903 births
1934 deaths
20th-century Japanese male actors
Male actors from Tokyo
20th-century deaths from tuberculosis
Tuberculosis deaths in Japan